Joacim Heier (born 27 January 1986) is a retired Norwegian football goalkeeper.

He hails from Rakkestad. He was capped as a youth and U21 international for Norway, and was a squad member for the 2005 UEFA European Under-19 Championship. Following several years in the 1. divisjon for Moss and Sarpsborg 08, he made his Eliteserien debut in August 2010 for Sandefjord. In 2011 he was mostly first-choice goalkeeper for Sarpsborg 08 in Eliteserien, but left for third-tier Kvik Halden after the season.

After the 2016 season he retired, and became managing director of Fredrikstad FK.

References

1986 births
Living people
People from Rakkestad
Norway youth international footballers
Norway under-21 international footballers
Norwegian footballers
Moss FK players
Sarpsborg 08 FF players
Sandefjord Fotball players
Kvik Halden FK players
Norwegian First Division players
Eliteserien players
Association football goalkeepers
Norwegian sports executives and administrators